Birmingham is the second-most populous city in England and the United Kingdom.

Birmingham may also refer to:

Communities

Canada
 Birmingham, Saskatchewan

United States
 Birmingham, Alabama, the largest city in Alabama
 Birmingham-Hoover-Cullman Combined Statistical Area
 Birmingham, Connecticut
 Birmingham, Indiana
 Birmingham, Tippecanoe County, Indiana
 Birmingham, Iowa
 Birmingham, Kansas
 Birmingham, Kentucky, a sunken town
 Birmingham, Michigan
 Birmingham, Missouri
 Birmingham, New Jersey
 Birmingham, Coshocton County, Ohio
 Birmingham, Erie County, Ohio
 Birmingham, Guernsey County, Ohio
 Birmingham, Chester County, Pennsylvania
 Birmingham, Huntingdon County, Pennsylvania
 Birmingham, Pittsburgh, Pennsylvania, the former name of Pittsburgh's South Side neighborhood
 Birmingham Township (disambiguation)

Education

United Kingdom
 Aston University, Birmingham, England (founded 1895)
 University of Birmingham, Birmingham, England (founded 1900)
 Birmingham City University, Birmingham, England (founded 1971)
 Newman University Birmingham, Birmingham, England (founded 1968)
 University College Birmingham, Birmingham, England (founded 1957)

United States
 Birmingham–Southern College, Birmingham, Alabama
 Birmingham High School, Los Angeles, California
 University of Alabama at Birmingham, Birmingham, Alabama

People
 Birmingham (surname), including a list of people with the name
 De Birmingham family, which held the lordship of Birmingham in England

Ships

Royal Navy
 HMS Birmingham (1913), a Town-class light cruiser launched in 1913 and sold in 1931
 HMS Birmingham (C19), a cruiser launched in 1936 and broken up in 1960
 HMS Birmingham (D86), a Type 42 destroyer in service from 1976 to 1999

United States Navy
 USS Birmingham (CL-2), a light cruiser in service from 1908 to 1923
 USS Birmingham (CL-62), a light cruiser,  in service from 1943 to 1946 and involved in heavy fighting in the Pacific Ocean during World War II
 USS Birmingham (SSN-695), a Los Angeles class nuclear attack submarine in service from 1978 to 1997

Songs
 "Birmingham" (1974), a song by Randy Newman from the album Good Old Boys
 Birmingham (Amanda Marshall song), 1996
 "Birmingham" (2001), a song by Drive-By Truckers from the album Southern Rock Opera
 "Birmingham" (2012), a song by Shovels & Rope
 "Birmingham (We Are Safe)", a song by the David Crowder*Band from the album Church Music
 "Birmingham Blues" (song), by Electric Light Orchestra, 1977
 “Birmingham” (2021), a song by the American Punk rock band NOFX from the album Single Album

Sport
 Birmingham Barons, a minor league baseball team
 Birmingham Bulls (WHA), a defunct professional ice hockey team
 Birmingham Bullets, a defunct basketball team
 Birmingham City F.C., an English football club that currently play in the Football League Championship
 Birmingham City L.F.C., an English ladies' football club
 Birmingham Football Club, a defunct English football club that formerly played at the Aston Lower Grounds
 Birmingham (horse), a British Thoroughbred racehorse
 Birmingham Stallions, a defunct American football team that played in the USFL

Transportation

Air travel
 Birmingham Airport, Birmingham, England
 Birmingham–Shuttlesworth International Airport, Birmingham, Alabama
 G-BDXJ, the former British Airways Boeing 747-200 City of Birmingham

Railroads
 Birmingham railway (disambiguation)
 Birmingham station (disambiguation)
 LMS Coronation Class (4)6235 City of Birmingham, an LMS Coronation Class steam railway locomotive

Other Transportation
 Birmingham Motors, U.S. automobile brand of the 1920s

Other uses
 Birmingham, a star in the constellation Cygnus
 Birmingham, a style of home described in the song Paint Me a Birmingham
 Birmingham (crater), a lunar crater
 Birmingham (HM Prison), a prison in Birmingham, England
 Birmingham (UK Parliament constituency), constituency 1832-85
 Birmingham City Council, Birmingham, England
 Birmingham gauge of wires and tubes

See also
 New Birmingham, County Tipperary, Ireland
 New Birmingham, Texas, United States